Rajgarh railway station is a railway station in Alwar district, Rajasthan. Its code is RHG. It serves Rajgarh town. The station consists of 2 platforms. Passenger, Express trains halt here.

References

Railway stations in Alwar district
Jaipur railway division